Büchenbronn Observation Tower is a lattice tower situated on the Büchenbronn Height (608.50 above sea level) near Pforzheim in the state of Baden-Württemberg, south-west Germany.

Structure
The tower was built in 1883 for the Society for the Beautification of Pforzheim (Verschönerungsverein Pforzheim) as an octagonal cast-iron tubing skeleton structure made from iron girders and pipes by the Louis Kühne Company of Dresden. On the matter of stability, the Deutsche Bauzeitung wrote in 1885 that "...the tower can easily be shifted into rather large fluctuations by only one visitor."

The tower belonged to the Society until 1933, then to the Black Forest Association until 1974, since when it has been the property of the city of Pforzheim. The last renovation took place after the "Lothar" storm of 25 December 1999.

See also
 List of towers

Printed sources
 Dieter Buck: Aussichtsziele im Ländle. Wandern, Entdecken, Erleben. Silberburg-Verlag, Tübingen 2004, S. 45 ff.
 Joachim Kleinmanns: Schau ins Land. Aussichtstürme. Jonas, Marburg 1999, .

External links 
 
 Der Büchenbronner Aussichtsturm im Stadtwiki Pforzheim/Enz
 http://skyscraperpage.com/diagrams/?b59146

Observation towers in Baden-Württemberg